Vincent Bal (born 25 February 1971) is a Belgian filmmaker and visual artist widely known for his artwork based around shadows cast by everyday objects. As a writer and director he is best known for Miss Minoes (2001), The Zigzag Kid (2012), Belgian Rhapsody (2014), and The Bloody Olive (1997).

Early life and education 
Bal was born on 25 February 1971 in Ghent, Belgium. He studied film directing at the Hogeschool Sint-Lukas Brussel.

Career

Film 
In the third year of his film degree, Bal directed the short film  (1993), which was selected for several festivals. He graduated in 1994 with the short film Tour de France (1994) which won several awards, including the Canal+ Award at the Clermont-Ferrand International Short Film Festival and Best Short Film at the Dresden Film Festival. After graduation, he directed The Bloody Olive (1997), a film noir spoof based on a comic book by Lewis Trondheim. In 1999, he directed  (Man of Steel), which won the International Jury Prize at the 2000 Berlin Kinderfilmfest. In 2012 he directed The Zigzag Kid (also titled Nono, the Zigzag Kid), a family adventure film starring Thomas Simon (as the title character) and Isabella Rossellini. The film is based on the novel of the same name by David Grossman.

Filmography 

 Sea Shadow (2020): short, director/writer
 Stranger (2017): documentary featurette, co-director
 Belgian Rhapsody (2014): feature, director/co-writer
 The Zigzag Kid (2012): feature, director/co-screenwriter
 Kika & Bob (2007–2008, 2014): animated TV series, co-Creator/writer/director
 Miss Minoes (2001): feature, director/co-screenwriter
  (1999): feature, director/writer
  (1997): short, director/co-writer
 The Bloody Olive (1996): short, director/screenwriter
 Tour de France (1994): short, director/writer
  (1993): short, director/writer

Illustration 
Bal is known for his shadow art illustrations, made by combining shadows cast from everyday objects with hand-drawn doodles. He began his ongoing “Shadowology” series in 2016 when he challenged himself to make a shadow doodle every day. On where the inspiration for the series came from, Bal says:"Like all good things in life, it came by accident. I was working on a film script (for a film that is never made) when I noticed how the shadow of my teacup looked a bit like an elephant. I gave the shadow animal eyes and a smile, and took a picture. When I shared it on social media, the reactions were really nice, so I decided to try and make one every day. That was may 2016 and I haven’t stopped since."Bal is currently working on the Shadowology live-action film that incorporates his shadow drawings and also has a published book of his illustrations by the same name.

Awards 
Algarve International Film Festival

Berlin International Film Festival

Brussels International Fantastic Film Festival (BIFFF)

Chicago International Children's Film Festival

Children KinoFest

Clermont-Ferrand International Short Film Festival

Dresden Film Festival

European Film Awards

Magritte Awards

Molodist International Film Festival

Montréal International Children's Film Festival

Oulu International Children's Film Festival

Tallinn Black Nights Film Festival

Torino International Festival of Young Cinema

References

External Links 
Official Website

Living people
1971 births
Belgian filmmakers
Belgian illustrators
Artists from Ghent